Irmingard of Henneberg was the daughter of Berthold I of Henneberg and Bertha of Putelendorf. She was born between 1134 and 1136. She was the older sister of Poppo VI von Henneberg (1140-1191), Lukardis von Henneberg (1142-1220), and Otto IV Count of Henneberg (1144-1212).

Marriage and Issue
Irmingard married Conrad, Count Palatine of the Rhine on 1160. She and Conrad had the following children.

Agnes of Hohenstaufen, 1176-1204; married Henry V, Count Palatine of the Rhine
Friedrich, stillborn son

Death
Irmingard died of unknown causes in 1197 at the age of 61-63. Her burial place is unknown.

References

House of Henneberg
Counts Palatine of the Rhine
Hohenstaufen
1130s births
1197 deaths
Year of birth uncertain